The Galerucinae are one of the largest subfamilies of leaf beetles (Chrysomelidae). In the traditional sense of the subfamily, excluding the flea beetles, it includes over 7000 species in over 500 genera.

A

 Abdullahius Abdullah & Qureshi, 1968
 Acalymma Barber, 1947
 Adoxia Broun, 1880
 Aelianus Jacoby, 1892
 Afrocandezea Wagner & Scherz, 2002
 Afrocrania Hincks, 1949
 Afromaculepta Hasenkamp & Wagner, 2000
 Afromegalepta Schmitz & Wagner, 2001
 Afronaumannia Steiner & Wagner, 2005
 Afropachylepta Esch & Wagner, 2009
 Afrorudolphia Bolz & Wagner, 2014
 Afrosoma Wilcox, 1973
 Afrotizea Stapel & Wagner, 2001
 Agelacida Jacoby, 1898
 Agelasa Motschulsky, 1861
 Agelastica Chevrolat, 1836
 Agelopsis Jacoby, 1896
 Agetocera Hope, 1831
 Allastena Broun, 1893
 Alopena Baly, 1864
 Alphidia Clark, 1865
 Amandus Jacoby, 1886
 Amphelasma Barber, 1947
 Amplioluperus Viswajyothi & Clark, 2022
 Anadimonia Ogloblin, 1936
 Anatela Silfverberg, 1982
 Androlyperus Crotch, 1873
 Anisobrotica Bechyné & Bechyné, 1970
 Anoides Weise, 1913
 Anomalonyx Weise, 1903
 Anthiphula Jacoby, 1892
 Antsianaka Duvivier, 1891
 Aplosonyx Chevrolat, 1836
 Apophylia Thomson, 1858 (= Apophylana Medvedev, 2019)
 Apteraulamorphus Beenen, 2010
 Apterogaleruca Chûjô, 1962
 Apteromicrus Chen & Jiang, 1981
 Apteroyinga Viswajyothi & Clark, 2020
 Arcastes Baly, 1865
 Arima Chapuis, 1875
 Arimetus Jacoby, 1903
 Aristobrotica Bechyné, 1956
 Arthrotidea Chen, 1942
 Arthrotus Motschulsky, 1858
 Asbecesta Harold, 1877
 Ashrafia Abdullah & Qureshi, 1968
 Astena Baly, 1865
 Astridella Laboissière, 1932
 Atrachya Dejean, 1836
 Atysa Baly, 1864
 Aulacophora Chevrolat, 1836
 Aulamorphoides Laboissière, 1926
 Aulamorphus Jacoby, 1897
 Austrochorina Bechyné, 1963
 Austrotella Silfverberg, 1975
 Azlania Mohamedsaid, 1996

B

 Bacteriaspis Weise, 1905
 Bangprella Kimoto, 1989
 Barombiella Laboissière, 1931
 Beenenia Bezděk, 2012
 Beiratia Jacoby, 1906
 Belarima Reitter, 1913
 Bicolorizea Heunemann, Dalstein, Schulze & Wagner, 2015
 Bipleura Laboissière, 1932
 Bonesia Baly, 1865
 Bonesioides Laboissière, 1925
 Borneola Mohamedsaid, 1998
 Borneotheopea Lee & Bezděk, 2020
 Brachyphora Jacoby, 1890
 Brachyruca Fairmaire, 1898
 Bradamina Fairmaire, 1904
 Brucita Wilcox, 1965
 Bryantiella Medvedev, 2009
 Bryobates Broun, 1886
 Buckibrotica Bechyné & Bechyné, 1970
 Buphonella Jacoby, 1903
 Buphonida Baly, 1865
 Burudromas Beenen, 2017
 Byblitea Baly, 1864

C

 Calaina Schaufuss, 1887
 Calomicrella Medvedev & Bezděk, 2002
 †Calomicroides Nadein, 2016
 Calomicrus Dillwyn, 1829
 Candezeososia Laboissière, 1932
 Candezea Chapuis, 1879
 Candezoides Duvivier, 1891
 Cannonia Hincks, 1949
 Capula Jacobson, 1925
 Caraguata Bechyné, 1954
 Carpiradialis Niño-Maldonado & Clark, 2020
 Cassena Weise, 1892
 Cassenoides Kimoto, 1989
 Ceratocalymma Hincks, 1949
 Cerochroa Gerstaecker, 1855
 Cerophysa Chevrolat, 1836
 Cerophysella Laboissière, 1930
 Cerotoma Chevrolat, 1836
 Chapuisia Duvivier, 1885
 Charaea Baly, 1878 (= Cneorides Jacoby, 1896)
 Chikatunolepta Bezděk, 2020
 Chinochya Lee, 2020
 Chlamigala Medvedev & Bezděk, 2002
 Chlorolochmaea Bechyné & Bechyné, 1969
 Chorina Baly, 1866
 Chosnia Berti, 1990
 Chthoneis Baly, 1864
 Chujoa Gressitt & Kimoto, 1963
 Clerotilia Jacoby, 1885
 Clitena Baly, 1864
 Clitenella Laboissière, 1927
 Clitenososia Laboissière, 1931
 Cneorane Baly, 1865
 Cneoranidea Chen, 1942
 Cneorella Medvedev & Dang, 1981
 Cochabamba Bechyné, 1955
 Coeligetes Jacoby, 1884
 Coeligetoides Bezděk, 2016
 Coelocrania Jacoby, 1886
 Coelomera Chevrolat, 1836
 Conchocera Laboissière, 1922
 Coraia Clark, 1865
 Cornubrotica Bechyné & Bechyné, 1970
 Cornuventer Viswajyothi & Clark, 2022
 Coronabrotica Moura, 2010
 Crampelia Laboissière, 1922
 Craniotectus Laboissière, 1932
 Cyclantipha Laboissière, 1932
 Cyclotrypema Blake, 1966
 Cydippa Chapuis, 1875
 Cynortella Duvivier, 1891
 Cynortina Weise, 1905

D

 Decarthrocera Laboissière, 1937
 Deinocladus Blake, 1966
 Dercetina Gressitt & Kimoto, 1963
 Dercetisoma Maulik, 1936
 Derospidea Blake, 1931
 Desbordelepta Nguyen & Gómez-Zurita, 2017 (formerly Desbordesius Laboissière, 1933)
 Diabrotica Chevrolat, 1836
 Diacantha Chevrolat, 1836
 Dicoelotrachelus Blake, 1941
 Dilinosa Weise, 1906
 Dimalianella Laboissière, 1940
 Diorhabda Weise, 1883
 Dircema Clark, 1865
 Dircemella Weise, 1902
 Doeberllepta Wagner, 2017
 Doryida Baly, 1865
 Doryidella Laboissière, 1940
 Doryidomorpha Laboissière, 1931
 Doryscus Jacoby, 1887
 Doryxena Baly, 1861
 Doryxenoides Laboissière, 1927
 Drasa Bryant, 1941
 Dreeus Shute, 1983
 Duvivieria Weise, 1903
 Dyolania Laboissière, 1931
 Dyserythra Weise, 1902
 Dysiodes Weise, 1908

E

 Eccoptopsis Blake, 1966
 Ectmesopus Blake, 1940
 Eleona Fairmaire, 1902
 Ellopidia Hincks, 1949
 Elyces Jacoby, 1888
 Emathea Baly, 1865
 Ensiforma Jacoby, 1876
 Epaenidea Gressitt & Kimoto, 1963
 Epiluperodes Gressitt & Kimoto, 1963
 Erganoides Jacoby, 1903
 Erynephala Blake, 1936
 Erythrobapta Weise, 1902
 Estcourtiana Jacoby, 1900
 Eubeiratia Laboissière, 1931
 Eucerotoma Laboissière, 1939
 Eugaleruca Laboissière, 1922
 Euliroetis Ogloblin, 1936
 Euluperus Weise, 1886
 Eumelepta Jacoby, 1892
 Eupachytoma Laboissière, 1940
 Eurycycla Jacoby, 1903
 Eusattodera Schaeffer, 1906
 Eustena Baly, 1879
 Exora Chevrolat, 1836
 Exosoma Jacoby, 1903
 Exosomella Laboissière, 1932
 Exosomorpha Laboissière, 1932

F

 Falsoexosoma Pic, 1926
 Fleutiauxia Laboissière, 1933
 Furusawaia Chûjô, 1962 (= Yunnaniata Lopatin, 2009)

G

 Galenaria Medvedev, 2007
 Galerosastra Laboissière, 1929
 Galerotella Maulik, 1936
 Galeruca Geoffroy, 1762 (including Rhabdotilla Jacobson, 1911)
 Galerucella Crotch, 1873
 Galerudolphia Hincks, 1949
 Galerumaea Hincks, 1949
 Galerusoma Jacoby, 1892
 Gallerucida Motschulsky, 1861
 Gastrida Chapuis, 1879
 Geethaluperus Viswajyothi & Clark, 2022
 Geinella Strand, 1935
 Geinula Ogloblin, 1936
 Glaucorhabda Weise, 1910
 Gonaives Clark, 1987
 Goudotina Weise, 1910
 Gronovius Jacoby, 1905
 Gynandrobrotica Bechyné, 1955

H

 Haemodoryida Chen, 1942
 Halinella Bechyné, 1956
 Hallirhotius Jacoby, 1888
 Halticopsis Fairmaire, 1883
 Halysacantha Laboissière, 1922
 Hamushia Chûjô, 1956
 Haplosomoides Duvivier, 1890
 Haplotia Jacoby, 1887
 Hatita Fairmaire, 1891
 Hecataeus Jacoby, 1888
 Hemiphracta Weise, 1902
 Hemistus Jacoby, 1886
 Hemygascelis Jacoby, 1896
 Hesperomorpha Ogloblin, 1936
 Hesperopenna Medvedev & Dang, 1981
 Heterochele Viswajyothi & Clark, 2021
 Hildebrandtianella Laboissière, 1932
 Himaplosonyx Chen, 1976
 Hirtigaleruca Chûjô, 1962
 Hirtomimastra Medvedev, 2009
 Hoplasoma Jacoby, 1884
 Hoplosaenidea Laboissière, 1933
 Hoplostines Blackburn, 1890
 Hovaliana Laboissière, 1932
 Huillania Laboissière, 1921
 Hylaspoides Duvivier, 1892
 Hymenesia Clark, 1865
 Hyperbrotica Bechyné & Bechyné, 1968
 Hyphaenia Baly, 1865
 Hystiopsis Blake, 1966

I

 Ikopista Fairmaire, 1901
 Impensa Wilcox, 1971
 Inbioluperus Clark, 1993
 Interbrotica Bechyné & Bechyné, 1965
 Isotes Weise, 1922
 Itaitubana Bechyné, 1963
 Itylus Jacoby, 1904
 Iucetima Moura, 1998

J

 Jacobya Weise, 1901
 Jacobyanella Laboissière, 1924
 Japonitata Strand, 1935
 Jolibrotica Lee & Bezděk, 2015

K

 Kanahiiphaga Laboissière, 1931
 Kanarella Jacoby, 1896
 Keitheatus Wilcox, 1965
 Khasia Jacoby, 1899
 Konbirella Duvivier, 1892
 Kumbalia Mohamedsaid & Takizawa, 2007
 Kumbornia Mohamedsaid, 2006

L

 Laetana Baly, 1864
 Laetiacantha Laboissière, 1921
 Lamprocopa Hincks, 1949
 Lanolepta Kimoto, 1991
 Laosixantha Kimoto, 1989
 Laphris Baly, 1864
 Leptarthra Baly, 1861
 Leptarthroides Beenen, 2009
 Leptaulaca Weise, 1902
 Leptomona Bechyné, 1958
 Leptonesiotes Blake, 1958
 Leptoxena Baly, 1888
 Lesnella Laboissière, 1932
 Lilophaea Bechyné, 1958
 Liroetina Medvedev, 2013
 Liroetis Weise, 1889 (= Siemssenius Weise, 1922 = Zangia Chen, 1976)
 Liroetoides Kimoto, 1989
 Lochmaea Weise, 1883
 Lomirana Laboissière, 1932
 Luisiadia Medvedev, 1979
 Luperacantha Laboissière, 1932
 Luperocella Jacoby, 1900
 Luperocida Medvedev & Dang, 1981
 Luperodes Motschulsky, 1858
 Luperogala Medvedev & Samoderzhenkov, 1989
 Luperolophus Fairmaire, 1876
 Luperosoma Jacoby, 1891
 Luperososia Laboissière, 1935
 Luperus Geoffroy, 1762
 Lusingania Laboissière, 1919
 Lygistus Wilcox, 1965

M

 Macrima Baly, 1878
 Madurasia Jacoby, 1896
 Maevatanania Bechyné, 1964
 Mahutia Laboissière, 1917
 Malaconida Fairmaire, 1886
 Malacorhinus Jacoby, 1887
 Malacotheria Fairmaire, 1881
 Marmina Shute, 1983
 Marseulia Joannis, 1865
 Masurius Jacoby, 1888
 Medythia Jacoby, 1887
 Megaleruca Laboissière, 1922
 Megalognatha Baly, 1878
 Megarhabda Viswajyothi & Clark, 2022
 Mellesia Weise, 1902
 Menippus Clark, 1864
 Meristata Strand, 1935
 Meristoides Laboissière, 1929
 Metacoryna Jacoby, 1888
 Metacycla Baly, 1861
 Metalepta Baly, 1861
 Metopoedema Duvivier, 1891
 Metrioidea Fairmaire, 1881
 Metrobrotica Bechyné, 1958
 Metrogaleruca Bechyné & Bechyné, 1969
 Mexiluperus Viswajyothi & Clark, 2022
 Microbrotica Jacoby, 1887
 Microexosoma Laboissière, 1931
 Microlepta Jacoby, 1886
 Microscelida Clark, 1998
 Miltina Chapuis, 1875 (= Liroegala Medvedev, 2015)
 Mimagitocera Maulik, 1936
 Mimastra Baly, 1865 (= Neoatysa Abdullah & Qureshi, 1968)
 Mimastracella Jacoby, 1903
 Mimastroides Jacoby, 1892
 Mimastrosoma Medvedev, 2004
 Mindana Allard, 1889
 Mindella Medvedev, 1995
 Mindorina Laboissière, 1940
 Miraces Jacoby, 1888
 Momaea Baly, 1865
 Mombasa Fairmaire, 1884
 Monardia Laboissière, 1939
 Monoaster Viswajyothi & Clark, 2022
 Monocesta Clark, 1865
 Monocestoides Duvivier, 1891
 Monocida Jacoby, 1899
 Monolepta Chevrolat, 1836
 Monoleptinia Laboissière, 1932
 Monoleptocrania Laboissière, 1940
 Monoleptoides Wagner, 2011
 Monoxia LeConte, 1865
 Morokasia Jacoby, 1904
 Morphosphaera Baly, 1861
 Morphosphaeroides Jacoby, 1903
 Munina Chen, 1976

N

 Nadrana Baly, 1865
 Nancita Allard, 1889
 Narichona Kirsch, 1883
 Neobarombiella Bolz & Wagner, 2012
 Neobrotica Jacoby, 1887
 Neochya Lee, 2020
 Neodrana Jacoby, 1886
 Neolepta Jacoby, 1884
 Neolochmaea Laboissière, 1939
 Neomahutia Laboissière, 1936
 Neophaestus Hincks, 1949
 Neorupilia Blackburn, 1888
 Nepalogaleruca Kimoto, 1970
 Nepalolepta Medvedev, 1992
 Nestinus Clark, 1865
 Niasia Jacoby, 1889
 Nirina Weise, 1892
 Nirinoides Jacoby, 1903
 Notonicea Hincks, 1949
 Nototrichaspis Hincks, 1949
 Nyctidromas Semenov, 1896
 Nyctiplanctus Blake, 1963
 Nymphius Weise, 1900

O

 Oides Weber, 1801
 Oidomorpha Laboissière, 1924
 Oorlogia Silfverberg, 1978
 Oosagitta Kortenhaus & Wagner, 2013
 Ootheca Dejean, 1836
 Oothecoides Kortenhaus & Wagner, 2011
 Ootibia Kortenhaus & Wagner, 2012
 Ophraea Jacoby, 1886
 Ophraella Wilcox, 1965
 Ornithognathus Thomson, 1858
 Oroetes Jacoby, 1888
 Orthoneolepta Hazmi & Wagner, 2013
 Orthoxia Clark, 1865
 Orthoxioides Laboissière, 1922

P

 Pachytomellina Hincks, 1949
 Palaeophylia Jacoby, 1903
 Palaeosastra Jacoby, 1906
 Paleosepharia Laboissière, 1936
 Pallasiola Jacobson, 1925
 Palmaria Bechyné, 1956
 Palpaenidea Laboissière, 1933
 Palpoxena Baly, 1861
 Panafrolepta Mertgen & Wagner, 2006
 Papuania Jacoby, 1906
 Parabrotica Bechyné & Bechyné, 1961
 Paraclitena Medvedev, 1972
 Parageina Laboissière, 1936
 Paragetocera Laboissière, 1929
 Paranapiacaba Bechyné, 1958
 Paraneolepta Hazmi & Wagner, 2013
 Paranoides Vachon, 1976
 Parantongila Laboissière, 1932
 Paraplotes Laboissière, 1933 (= Shensia Chen, 1964)
 Parapophylia Laboissière, 1922
 Parasbecesta Laboissière, 1940
 Paraspitiella Chen & Jiang, 1981
 Parastetha Baly, 1879
 Paratriarius Schaeffer, 1906
 Paraxenoda Mohamedsaid, 1999
 Parexosoma Laboissière, 1932
 Paridea Baly, 1886 (= Neosastra Abdullah & Qureshi, 1968)
 Paumomua Jacoby, 1904
 Periclitena Weise, 1902
 Philastra Medvedev, 1995
 Phyllecthris Dejean, 1836
 Phyllobrotica Chevrolat, 1836
 Phyllobroticella Jacoby, 1894
 Phyllocleptis Weise, 1913
 Pimentelia Laboissière, 1932
 Plagiasma Weise, 1903
 Platybrotica Cabrera & Cabrera Walsh, 2004
 Platycesta Viswajyothi & Clark, 2021
 Platymorpha Jacoby, 1888
 Platynocera Blanchard, 1846
 Pleronexis Weise, 1908
 Polexima Weise, 1903
 Polysastra Shute, 1983
 Poneridia Weise, 1908
 Porechontes Blake, 1966
 Porphytoma Jacoby, 1903
 Potamobrotica Blake, 1966
 Prasyptera Baly, 1878
 Prathapanius Viswajyothi & Clark, 2020
 Priapina Jacoby, 1887
 Proegmena Weise, 1889
 Prosmidia Weise, 1901
 Protocoelocrania Laboissière, 1931
 Protoleptonyx Laboissière, 1932
 Pseudadimonia Duvivier, 1891
 Pseudaenidea Laboissière, 1938
 Pseudaplosonyx Duvivier, 1884
 Pseudapophylia Jacoby, 1903
 Pseudespera Chen, Wang & Jiang, 1985
 Pseudeustetha Jacoby, 1899
 Pseudikopista Laboissière, 1932
 Pseudocneorane Medvedev & Romantsov, 2012
 Pseudocophora Jacoby, 1884
 Pseudodiabrotica Jacoby, 1892
 Pseudoides Jacoby, 1892
 Pseudolognatha Jacoby, 1903
 Pseudoluperus Beller & Hatch, 1932
 Pseudomalaxia Laboissière, 1926
 Pseudorupilia Jacoby, 1893
 Pseudosastra Jacoby, 1904
 Pseudoscelida Jacoby, 1894
 Pseudosepharia Laboissière, 1936
 Pseudoshaira Beenen, 2007
 Pseudotheopea Lee & Bezděk, 2020
 Pteleon Jacoby, 1888
 Pterophthinus Gressitt & Kimoto, 1963
 Pubibrotica Medvedev, 2002
 Pyesexora Viswajyothi & Clark, 2022
 Pyesia Clark, 1865
 Pyrrhalta Joannis, 1865

R

 Rachicephala Blake, 1966
 Radymna Reitter, 1913 (= Farsogaleruca Lopatin, 1981)
 Rohania Laboissière, 1921
 Rohaniella Laboissière, 1940
 Romanita Bechyné, 1958
 Rubrarcastes Hazmi & Wagner, 2010
 Rupilia Clark, 1864
 Ruwenzoria Laboissière, 1919

S

 Sakaramya Bechyné, 1952
 Salaminia Heller, 1898
 Samoria Silfverberg, 1982
 Sarawakiola Mohamedsaid, 1997
 Sardoides Jacoby, 1895
 Sastra Baly, 1865
 Sastracella Jacoby, 1899
 Sastroides Jacoby, 1884
 Scelida Chapuis, 1875
 Scelidacne Clark, 1998
 Scelolyperus Crotch, 1874
 Schematiza Chevrolat, 1836
 Schematizella Jacoby, 1888
 Scruptoluperus Laboissière, 1925
 Sermylassa Reitter, 1913
 Sermyloides Jacoby, 1884
 Sesselia Laboissière, 1931
 Shaira Maulik, 1936
 Shairella Chûjô, 1962
 Shairoidea Beenen, 2013
 Shamshera Maulik, 1936
 Shungwayana Silfverberg, 1975
 Sikkimia Duvivier, 1891
 Simopsis Blake, 1966
 Sinoluperoides Kimoto, 1989
 Sinoluperus Gressitt & Kimoto, 1963
 Socorroita Bechyné, 1956
 Sonchia Weise, 1901
 Sonyadora Bechyné, 1958
 Sosibiella Jacoby, 1896
 Sphenoraia Clark, 1865
 Sphenorella Medvedev & Sprecher-Uebersax, 1998
 Spilocephalus Jacoby, 1888
 Spilonotella Cockerell, 1905
 Spitiella Laboissière, 1931
 Stenellina Cockerell, 1905
 Stenoplatys Baly, 1861
 Stictocema Jacoby, 1906
 Striganovia Medvedev, 2002
 Strobiderus Jacoby, 1884
 Strumatea Baly, 1886
 Sumatrasia Jacoby, 1884
 Synetocephalus Fall, 1910
 Synodita Chapuis, 1875
 Syphaxia Baly, 1866

T

 Taenala Silfverberg, 1978
 Taiwanaenidea Kimoto, 1984
 Taiwanoshaira Lee & Beenen, 2020
 Taphina Duvivier, 1885
 Tarachodia Weise, 1902
 Taumacera Thunberg, 1814 (= Acroxena Baly, 1879 = Kinabalua Mohamedsaid, 1997 = Xenarthra Baly, 1861)
 Texiluperus Viswajyothi & Clark, 2022
 Theone Gistel, 1857
 Theopea Baly, 1864
 Theopella Laboissière, 1940
 Therpis Weise, 1900
 Trachyelytron Viswajyothi & Clark, 2022
 Trachyscelida Horn, 1893
 Triariodes Clark & Anderson, 2019
 Triarius Jacoby, 1887
 Trichobalya Weise, 1924
 Trichobrotica Bechyné, 1956
 Trichocneorane Laboissière, 1935
 Tricholochmaea Laboissière, 1932
 Trichomimastra Weise, 1922
 Trichosepharia Laboissière, 1936
 Trigonexora Bechyné & Bechyné, 1970
 Trirhabda LeConte, 1865
 Tschitscherinula Jacobson, 1908
 Tsouchya Lee, 2020

U

 Uaupesia Bechyné, 1958

V

 Vietoluperina Medvedev, 2015
 Vietoluperus Medvedev & Dang, 1981
 Vitruvia Jacoby, 1903

W

 Witteochaloenus Laboissière, 1940

X

 Xanthogaleruca Laboissière, 1934
 Xenarthracella Laboissière, 1940
 Xenoda Baly, 1877
 Xingeina Chen, Jiang & Wang, 1987

Y

 Yingabruxia Viswajyothi & Clark, 2022
 Yingaresca Bechyné, 1956
 Yulenia Jacoby, 1886
 Yunaspes Chen, 1976

Z

 Zangastra Chen & Jiang, 1981
 Zepherina Bechyné, 1958
 Zischkaita Bechyné, 1956
 Zizonia Chen, 1976

See also
 List of flea beetle genera

References

Galerucinae